Strážce duší (Guardian of Souls) is a Czech adventure television series produced by Czech Television.

About series
The series tells stories of the Guardian of Souls. Writer Viktor Armín and student Kateřina Nelserová try to uncover mysterious events in which the inexplicable past meets the present because nothing is as we thought. Across the ocean of all eternity roam the guardians of souls. The yäre guided by many laws of providence to guard what is to remain hidden and instead reveal only what is to be revealed. In the service of fate, they take on human form, but their faces are only allowed to be seen by a select few.

The first 6 parts were filmed in 2003 by the creative group Arichteva-Prachařová with directors Dušan Klein and Juraj Deák. In 2004, 3 more parts were shot and the last 4 in 2007/2008. The first 9 episodes were broadcast in 2005 while last 4 episodes were broadcast in 2009.

Cast
Lukáš Vaculík as Viktor Armín
Zuzana Norisová as Kateřina Nelserová
David Suchařípa as guardian of souls
Jiří Dvořák as captain Valdek
David Viktora as pathologist Dvořáček
Ilja Racek as professor Bejlovec
Jana Hubinská as Baková
Tomáš Jirman as parish priest
Anna Cónová as housekeeper Anna

External links
Website (in Czech)

References 

Czech adventure television series
Czech mystery television series
2005 television series debuts
2009 television series endings
Czech Television original programming